Wisch may refer to:

Places

Wisch, Gelderland, a former municipality in Gelderland, the Netherlands
Wisch, Nordfriesland, a municipality in the district of Nordfriesland, Schleswig-Holstein, Germany
Wisch, Plön, a municipality in the district of Plön, Schleswig-Holstein, Germany

People

 Theodor Wisch, World War II German Waffen-SS general